Laura Feiersinger (born 5 April 1993) is an Austrian footballer who plays as a midfielder for German Frauen-Bundesliga club Eintracht Frankfurt and the Austria women's national team.

Club career

USK Hof, 2008–2010
Feiersinger starter her senior career with USK Hof in the ÖFB-Frauenliga, the Austrian league.  She spent two years at the club, playing in 36 regular season games and scoring 9 goals.

Herforder SV, 2010–2011
Feiersinger was recruited and signed for Herforder SV who then played in the Frauen-Bundesliga, the top flight of German Football.  This move required her to leave home at age 18. While playing for Herforder she made 18 regular season appearances, scoring 7 goals.  Feiersinger left the club after they were relegated to the 2. Frauen-Bundesliga.

Bayern Munich, 2011–2016
Feiersinger signed for Bundesliga side FC Bayern Munich in 2011.  During her first year at the club she won the DFB Pokal, Germany's second-most important title in women's football. In March 2014 she suffered a serious injury, breaking her shin and fibula.   However, she was able to get her contract with the club renewed in 2015. She went on to win back to back Frauen Bundesliga titles in 2014–2015 and 2015–2016. At the time of her departure in 2016 Feiersinger had made 62 regular season appearances.

SC Sand, 2016–2018
Feiersinger moved to SC Sand ahead of the 2016–2017 season in order to get more regular playing time.  During her first season with the club she was runner-up for the 2016–17 DFB-Pokal Frauen. She left SC Sand after two seasons, 39 regular season appearances and 5 goals.

FFC Frankfurt, 2018–
Feiersinger signed Bundesliga side 1. FFC Frankfurt ahead of their 2018–2019 season on a two-year contract. During her first year with the club she made 21 appearances, scoring 10 goals.

International career
She has been a member of the Austrian national team since 2010.  With Austria she won the 2016 Cyprus Cup.  She was part of the squad which qualified and went to their first major tournament, the UEFA Women's Euro 2017 in the Netherlands. The team did exceptionally well, reaching the semi-finals which it lost to Denmark on penalty shots.  Feiersinger players every single minute of the tournament for Austria.

International goals
''Scores and results list Austria's goal tally first:

Personal life
When Feiersinger was younger she tried a variety of sports including biathlon, athletics, cross country and football.  She entered the Austrian sports school model (SSM) and at age 15 decided to specialize as a footballer. Wolfgang Feiersinger, her father, is a former footballer who won the champions league playing for Borussia Dortmund and also played for the Austrian national team.

Feiersinger also pursued a bachelor's degree in sports science.

Honours
 Bayern München
 Bundesliga: Winner 2014–15, 2015–16
 DFB-Pokal: Winner 2011–12

Austria 
 Cyprus Women's Cup: Winner 2016

Individual
 Austrian Footballer of the Year: 2012

We Play Strong
Feiersinger is one of UEFA's official ambassadors for #WePlayStrong, a social media and vlogging campaign which was launched in 2018.  The campaign's  "...aim is to promote women’s football as much as we can and to make people aware of women’s football, really,” Lisa Evans, another participant explains. “The ultimate goal is to make football the most played sport by females by 2020. So it’s a UEFA initiative to get more women and girls playing football, whether they want to be professional or not.”  The series, which also originally included professional footballers Sarah Zadrazil, Eunice Beckmann, Lisa Evans and now also includes Petronella Ekroth and Shanice van de Sanden, follows the daily lives of female professional footballers.

Social media
Instagram
Twitter

Notes

References

1993 births
Living people
People from Saalfelden
Austrian women's footballers
Austria women's international footballers
Expatriate women's footballers in Germany
FC Bayern Munich (women) players
SC Sand players
1. FFC Frankfurt players
Eintracht Frankfurt (women) players
Austrian expatriate women's footballers
Austrian expatriate sportspeople in Germany
Women's association football midfielders
Frauen-Bundesliga players
Footballers from Salzburg (state)
UEFA Women's Euro 2022 players
UEFA Women's Euro 2017 players
FIFA Century Club